2nd SLGFCA Awards
January 8, 2006

Best Film: 
Brokeback Mountain

Best Director: 
Ang Lee
Brokeback Mountain
The  2nd St. Louis Gateway Film Critics Association Awards  were given on January 8, 2006.

Winners and nominees

Best Actor
Heath Ledger - Brokeback Mountain as Ennis del Mar
 Pierce Brosnan - The Matador 
 Russell Crowe - Cinderella Man
 Ralph Fiennes - The Constant Gardener
 Philip Seymour Hoffman - Capote
 Cillian Murphy - Breakfast on Pluto
 Joaquin Phoenix - Walk the Line
 David Strathairn - Good Night, and Good Luck

Best Actress
Judi Dench - Mrs Henderson Presents as Mrs Henderson
 Claire Danes - Shopgirl
 Felicity Huffman - Transamerica
 Keira Knightley - Pride & Prejudice
 Laura Linney - The Squid and the Whale
 Gwyneth Paltrow - Proof
 Charlize Theron - North Country
 Reese Witherspoon - Walk the Line

Best Animated, Musical or Comedy Film
Wedding Crashers
 The 40-Year-Old Virgin
 Corpse Bride
 Madagascar
 The Matador
 The Producers
 Robots
 Wallace & Gromit: The Curse of the Were-Rabbit

Best Cinematography or Visual/Special Effects
King Kong
 Brokeback Mountain
 The Constant Gardener
 Good Night, and Good Luck 
 Memoirs of a Geisha
 Pride & Prejudice
 Sin City
 War of the Worlds

Best Director
Ang Lee - Brokeback Mountain
 Woody Allen - Match Point
 George Clooney - Good Night, and Good Luck
 David Cronenberg - A History of Violence
 Peter Jackson - King Kong
 Fernando Meirelles - The Constant Gardener
 Frank Miller and Robert Rodriguez - Sin City
 Steven Spielberg - Munich

Best Documentary Feature
March of the Penguins 
 The Aristocrats
 Born into Brothels
 Enron: The Smartest Guys in the Room
 Grizzly Man
 Mad Hot Ballroom
 Murderball
 The Wild Parrots of Telegraph Hill

Best Film
Brokeback Mountain 
 Capote
 Cinderella Man
 The Constant Gardener
 Good Night, and Good Luck
 Match Point
 Mrs Henderson Presents
 Syriana

Best Foreign Language Film
Tsotsi • South Africa
 2046 • China
 The Beautiful Country • Norway
 Downfall • Germany
 Kung Fu Hustle • China
 Oldboy • South Korea
 Paradise Now • Palestine
 Walk on Water • Israel

Best Overlooked Film or Most Original, Artistically Innovative or Creative Film
Sin City
 2046
 The Dying Gaul
 Junebug
 Layer Cake
 Me and You and Everyone We Know
 Nobody Knows
 Thumbsucker

Best Screenplay
Brokeback Mountain - Larry McMurtry and Diana Ossana
 Breakfast on Pluto - Neil Jordan
 Capote - Dan Futterman
 The Constant Gardener - Jeffrey Caine
 Crash - Paul Haggis and Bobby Moresco
 Good Night, and Good Luck - George Clooney and Grant Heslov
 Match Point - Woody Allen
 Munich - Tony Kushner and Eric Roth

Best Supporting Actor
George Clooney - Syriana as Bob Barnes
 George Clooney - Good Night, and Good Luck
 Paul Giamatti - Cinderella Man
 Jake Gyllenhaal - Brokeback Mountain
 Bob Hoskins - Mrs Henderson Presents
 Greg Kinnear - The Matador 
 Oliver Platt - Casanova
 Mickey Rourke - Sin City

Best Supporting Actress
Rachel Weisz - The Constant Gardener as Tessa Quayle
 Amy Adams - Junebug
 Catherine Keener - Capote
 Shirley MacLaine - In Her Shoes
 Frances McDormand - North Country
 Sharon Wilkins - Palindromes
 Michelle Williams - Brokeback Mountain
 Renée Zellweger - Cinderella Man

References
IMDb - St. Louis Film Critics Association Awards

2005
2005 film awards
2005 in Missouri
St Louis